John Walton Collier (April 3, 1929 – September 19, 1950) was a soldier in the United States Army during the Korean War. On June 24, 1951, he posthumously received the Medal of Honor for his actions during the breakout from the Pusan Perimeter.

Awards and decorations

Medal of Honor citation
Rank and organization: Corporal, U.S. Army, Company C, 27th Infantry Regiment, 25th Infantry Division

Place and date: Near Chindong-ni, Korea, September 19, 1950,

Entered service at: Worthington, Ky. Born: April 3, 1929, Worthington, Ky

G.O. No.: 86, August 2, 1951.

Citation
Cpl. Collier, Company C, distinguished himself by conspicuous gallantry and intrepidity above and beyond the call of duty in action. While engaged in an assault on a strategic ridge strongly defended by a fanatical enemy, the leading elements of his company encountered intense automatic weapons and grenade fire. Cpl. Collier and 3 comrades volunteered and moved forward to neutralize an enemy machine gun position which was hampering the company's advance, but they were twice repulsed. On the third attempt, Cpl. Collier, despite heavy enemy fire and grenade barrages, moved to an exposed position ahead of his comrades, assaulted and destroyed the machine gun nest, killing at least 4 enemy soldiers. As he returned down the rocky, fire-swept hill and joined his squad, an enemy grenade landed in their midst. Shouting a warning to his comrades, he, selflessly and unhesitatingly, threw himself upon the grenade and smothered its explosion with his body. This intrepid action saved his comrades from death or injury. Cpl. Collier's supreme, personal bravery, consummate gallantry, and noble self-sacrifice reflect untold glory upon himself and uphold the honored traditions of the military service.

See also

List of Medal of Honor recipients
List of Korean War Medal of Honor recipients

Notes

References

1929 births
1950 deaths
United States Army Medal of Honor recipients
American military personnel killed in the Korean War
Korean War recipients of the Medal of Honor
Deaths by hand grenade
United States Army personnel of the Korean War
United States Army non-commissioned officers